Alon Moni Abutbul (or Aboutboul, ; born 28 May 1965) is an Israeli actor. He won the IFFI Best Actor Award (Male) at the 44th International Film Festival of India.

Early life
Abutbul was born in Kiryat Ata, Israel, to a Mizrahi Jewish family from Egypt and Algeria. He attended the Thelma Yellin High School of Arts in Givatayim. His older brother is Avraham Abutbul.

Cinematic career

1980s
After graduating from the Thelma Yellin High School in 1983 Abutbul appeared in the Israeli film Hapnimiyah.  In 1985 Abutbul starred in the film Bar 51 directed by Amos Guttman alongside Mosko Alkalai and Smadar Kilchinsky, and took part in the Israeli film Battle of the Chairmanship in which he played alongside the popular Israeli comedy group HaGashash HaHiver. In 1986 Abutbul appeared in the film Malkat Hakitah.

Abutbul's first role in a big popular film was in 1986 when he was cast in the Israeli film Shtei Etzbaot Mi'Tzidon (Two Fingers from Sidon), a film which took place in the 1982 Lebanon War. For his performance in this film Abutbul was later awarded the "Best Actor" award at the Jerusalem Film Festival. That year he also played in the American-Israeli co-production Every Time We Say Goodbye in which he played alongside Gila Almagor. In 1987 Abutbul appeared in the Israeli Photo Roman. A year later, Abutbul played in the Israeli film Makom L'Yad Hayam alongside Anat Tzachor and in the American film Rambo III alongside Sylvester Stallone.

In 1989, after appearing in a short film called Ha-Kluv and in the Israeli-American coproduction Streets of Yesterday, Abutbul appeared in the Israeli film Ehad Mishelanu (One of Us), alongside Dan Toren and Sharon Alexander. For his performance in the film Abutbul was awarded the "Best Actor" award in the Jerusalem Film Festival.

1990s
In 1991, Abutbul played in the American film Killing Streets. A year later, in 1992, Abutbul starred in the Israeli film Roked Al Hahof. In 1993 Abutbul played in the Israeli film Ha-Yerusha alongside Avi Toledano. In 1993 Abutbul played in the direct to video American action film Deadly Heroes directed by Menahem Golan in which he played alongside Uri Gavriel.

In 1995, Abutbul produced Gur Bentwich's film Ha-Kochav Hakachol in which he played the leading role. In 1995 Abutbul played in the Israeli film Leylasede alongside Gila Almagor and Anat Waxman, and also played in the Israeli film Ha-Khetzi HaSheni alongside Orna Banai. In 1998 Abutbul played in the Israeli TV film Mazal dagim and the Israeli film Gentila. In 1999 he participated in the Israeli film Love at Second Sight.

2000s
In 2000, Abutbul won the "Film actor of the decade" award at the Haifa International Film Festival.

In 2001, Abutbul played in the film The Order alongside Jean-Claude Van Damme and Charlton Heston among others. That same year he participated in the Israeli films Mars Turkey, and A Five Minutes Walk.

In 2003, Abutbul played in the Israeli film Nina's Tragedies alongside Ayelet Zurer and Yoram Hatab. For his role in this film Abutbul later won an Ophir Award for the Best Supporting Actor.

In 2005, Abutbul played alongside Moni Moshonov and Yuval Segal in the Israeli film Dance, and appeared in the American film Munich directed by Steven Spielberg. In 2006 Abutbul played in the award-winning Israeli film Beaufort directed by Joseph Cedar. In 2007 Abutbul played alongside Mili Avital and Anat Waxman in the film Noodle directed by Ayelet Menahemi and starred in the Israeli film Rak Klavim Ratzim Hofshi alongside Lior Ashkenazi, Ayelet Zurer and Assi Dayan.

In 2008, Abutbul played in the Israeli film Shiva, and in the American film Body of Lies directed by Ridley Scott in which he played alongside Leonardo DiCaprio and Russell Crowe. In 2009 Abutbul starred in Yigal Burstein's film Hand of God alongside Moshe Ivgy and Dorit Bar-Or. In July 2008 Abutbul and Moshe Ivgy were awarded the Best Actor Award at the Jerusalem Film Festival for their roles in this film.

2010s
In 2012, Abutbul appeared in The Dark Knight Rises, as an original character, Dr. Leonid Pavel. The film was released in theaters in North America on 20 July 2012. In 2016, Abutbul co-starred in the film London Has Fallen, as the arms dealer turned terrorist mastermind Aamir Barkawi, alongside Gerard Butler, Aaron Eckhart and Morgan Freeman.
In 2015 he participated in the movie Septembers of Shiraz with Salma Hayek and Adrien Brody as Mohsen, a revolutionary guard interrogator who releases Ishak (Brody) and destroys evidence of his collaboration with the Shah's regime, selling jewelry to the empress. Release is partly due to bribery and partly due to mercy and justice.

Theater
Throughout the years, Abutbul played many theater shows, mostly in the Habima Theatre, which included among others: Hamlet, Caviar and Lentils, Blood Brothers, Closer, and Forgiveness.

Abutbul also played in the Haifa Theater in various plays which included among others King Lear, Andorra, Yair, and Ben-Shitrit's Baby.

TV
In 1997, Abutbul played alongside the Israeli actress Tinker Bell and Sivan Shavit in the Israeli drama A Speck on the Eyelash. In 1998 Abutbul played in the Israeli drama series Campaign. That same year he starred alongside Rivka Michaeli in the Israeli TV film Im Hukim. Since 1999 Abutbul began playing in the award-winning Israel drama series Shabatot VeHagim, alongside Dror Keren, Merav Gruber, Lior Ashkenazi and Yael Abecassis. The series lasted five seasons until 2004. Abutbul also directed one episode of the series.

In 2004, Abutbul participated in the Israeli TV movie Egoz. In 2005 Abutbul played alongside Yigal Adika in the Israeli drama series Melanoma My Love which aired on the Israeli Channel 2. In 2006 Abutbul starred alongside Maya Dagan and Orna Banai in the Israeli Drama series Ima'le which was broadcast on the Israeli channel 2.

In 2007, Abutbul participated in the third season of the reality show Dancing with the Stars which was broadcast on the Israeli Channel 2 and in addition to that he appeared in the Israeli drama series Lost and Found. In 2009 Abutbul participated in the third season of the Israeli telenovela Ha-Alufa.

In 2010, Abutbul made guest appearances in several American television series, including NCIS, Fringe, The Mentalist and Castle.

In 2012, Abutbul made an appearance in several more American television series, including Burn Notice and the season 2 finale of Homeland.

In 2013, Abutbul has made appearances in the AMC series Low Winter Sun.

Abutbul is a cast member of Snowfall, a TV series that is a FX production. The series premiered on July 5, 2017. He portrays the character of Avi Drexler on this show.

Abutbul starred in the Tales of Arcadia series in 3Below where voiced the series main villain General Val Morando.

January 8, 2020 he appeared as Zev Shazam in Hawaii Five-0.

2022 he appeared as Pavel Novikoff in FBI: International Season 1 Episode 21

Personal life
Today, Abutbul lives in Los Angeles with his longtime girlfriend Israeli director Shir Bilya, with whom he has four children.

Abutbul is the younger brother of the late singer and actor Avraham Abutbul who later became a Hasidic Jew.

Abutbul is known for his social and political involvement: During the 2006 elections in Israel, Abutbul supported the Israeli Labor Party. During that time he wrote a special column in the Israeli web portal Walla! and the popular Israeli news website Ynet and in addition he composed a special song which dealt with corruption in Israeli society and leadership.

Filmography

References

External links

1965 births
Living people
Jewish Israeli male actors
Israeli male film actors
Israeli male television actors
Israeli male stage actors
IFFI Best Actor (Male) winners
Israeli people of Egyptian-Jewish descent
Israeli people of Algerian-Jewish descent
People from Kiryat Ata
20th-century Israeli Jews
21st-century Israeli Jews
Israeli Sephardi Jews
Israeli Mizrahi Jews
Israeli expatriates in the United States
20th-century Israeli male actors
21st-century Israeli male actors